The Perendale is a breed of sheep developed in New Zealand by Massey Agricultural College (now Massey University) for use in steep hill situations.  The breed is named after Sir Geoffrey Peren, and it achieves its aims by being the offspring of Romney ewes and Cheviot rams with sturdy legs. It is raised primarily for meat.

History
Since the early 1980s, the flock numbers of this sheep has increased, mainly because hill-country farming has increased and they are more adaptable to the terrain.  
Developed from the Cheviot and Romney, the Perendale is a dual-purpose sheep producing wool fibres of  diameter with a  staple length. The Perendale is characteristically a high fertility animal, and has great potential to produce a prime ewe lamb when crossed with the Merino. As a purebred, its hardiness makes it ideally suited to colder, high-rainfall areas. The Perendale is easy to care for; the ewes have little trouble lambing and are good mothers.

Characteristics
The average fiber diameter is 29 to 35 microns. The USDA wool grade is 44's to 54's.

References

External links
Perendale Sheep Society of New Zealand

Sheep breeds
Sheep breeds originating in New Zealand